Song Hanliang (December 1934 – October 3, 2000) was a Chinese politician, notable for being the Party Secretary of the Xinjiang Uyghur Autonomous Region during the economic reform era.

Born in Shaoxing, Zhejiang province, Song worked for the Xinjiang Zhongsu Petroleum Company, then became a research director at the Xinjiang Petroleum Administrative Bureau. He became a deputy head of the Bureau in 1980. In 1983, he became the Vice Chairman of the Xinjiang Uyghur Autonomous Region. In October 1985, Song was promoted to Party Secretary, the top office in the region; he served in the office until December 1994.

Song was an alternate member of the 12th Central Committee of the Chinese Communist Party, and a full member of the 13th and 14th Central Committees. He also served as a delegate to the 6th, 7th, and 8th National People's Congress.

References

Politicians from Shaoxing
1934 births
2000 deaths
Chinese Communist Party politicians from Zhejiang
People's Republic of China politicians from Zhejiang
Political office-holders in Xinjiang